Anand Neelakantan is one of India's top selling authors with more than 12 books to his credit. Anand is also a columnist, screenwriter, and public speaker. He is known for writing mythological fictions and has authored Twelve books in English and one in Malayalam. He has also written screenplays for popular television series in Hindi in various GEC and OTT platforms. He has been writing a column named Acute angle in the New Indian Express since 2017. Anand has acted in two Advertisement films and has also played the role of the antagonist Ettappa Naicker in the Doordarshan Television show Swaraj. He follows the style of telling stories based on the perspective of the antagonists or supporting characters of a larger work. His debut work Asura: Tale of the Vanquished (2012) was based on the Indian epic Ramayana, told from the perspective of Ravana—the first book in his Ramayana series. It was followed by series of books based on characters from Mahabharata and Baahubali. His books have been translated to different languages such as Tamil, Hindi, Malayalam, Telugu, Kannada, Marathi, Bengali, Gujarati, Assamese, English, and Indonesian. Anand has written screenplays for popular Hindi television serials like Siya Ke Ram in Star TV, Mahabali Hanuman in SONY TV, Chakravarthy Ashoka in Colors TV, Sarfarosh in Netflix, Swaraj in DD National etc.

Asura was featured in the list of "100 books by Indian authors to read in a lifetime" by Amazon Books editors. The book has sold more than a million copies across the years. Three of his books have been shortlisted for Crossword Book Award during the respective years. He was listed as one among the "100 top celebrities in India" in 2015 and 2017 by Forbes India. Anand also writes a column for The New Indian Express on current affairs and his fortnightly column is called "Acute Angle".

Early life
He was born in Thripoonithura a village on the outskirts of Cochin in Kerala. Anand Neelakantan is an alumnus of Government Engineering College, Trichur in Kerala. He worked for Indian Oil Corporation from 1999 to 2022, before leaving the corporation for a full time career in writing. He draws cartoons for Malayalam magazines. He is married to Aparna Anand and they have two children: Ananya Anand and Abhinav Anand.

Career

His debut novel Asura: Tale of the Vanquished was published by Leadstart Publishing on 14 May 2012. The book became a surprise bestseller, breaking into the top seller charts within a week of its launch. His second book was based on Mahabharata told from the perspective of Kaurava and was part of a two-book series. Ajaya: Roll of the Dice was released in December 2013 and the sequel Ajaya: Rise of Kali was released in July 2015.

Anand Neelakantan wrote the official prequel series of novels for the Baahubali film series. Titled Bahubali: Before the Beginning, it is a three-book series which acts as a prequel to the films. The first book of the trilogy, The Rise of Sivagami, from the Bahubali: Before the Beginning trilogy released on 7 March 2017. S. S. Rajamouli, the director of Baahubali series, revealed the cover of the book at the Jaipur Literature Festival in 2017. The book became a blockbuster and was shortlisted for Crossword Popular Award 2018. Netflix has announced a webseries on the book. The second book in the series, Chaturanga was released on 6 August 2020. The third book, Queen of Mahishmathi, was released on 28 December 2020.
Anand's debut Children's book, The Very Extremely Most Naughty Asura tales for Kids was published on 28 September 2020 by Puffin books. Anand Neelakantan's fifth book Vanara, the legend of Baali, Sugreeva and Tara is published by Penguin Random House and is a best seller. DAR films and KR movies have announced that they have won the film adoption rights and will be producing a multilingual film on Vanara. Anand's Malayalam work Pennramayanam has been published by Mathrubhumi Books. Storytel published Anand's first Audio drama, Nala's Damayanti on 14 March 2022. The audio drama has appeared in 9 Indian languages.

List of works

Novels 
Ramayana based
 Asura: Tale of the Vanquished (2012)
 Bhoomija: Sita (2017)
 Shanta: The Story of Rama's Sister (2017)
 Ravana's Sister: Meenakshi (2018)
 Vanara: The Legend of Baali, Sugreeva and Tara (2018)
 Pennramayanam (Malayalam) (2019)
 Valmiki's Women (2021)

Mahabharata based
 Ajaya: Roll of the Dice (2013)
 Ajaya: Rise of Kali (2015)

Bahubali series
 The Rise of Sivagami (2017)
 Chaturanga (2020)
 Queen of Mahishmathi (2020)

Children's books
The Very Extremely Most Naughty Asura tales for Kids (Puffin Books) (2020)

Audio Books
Many Ramayanas, Many Lessons (Audible.com) (2021)

Nala's Damayanti (Storytel.com) (2021)

Television
Chakravartin Ashoka Samrat (Colors TV)
Siya Ke Ram (Star Plus)
Sankatmochan Mahabali Hanuman (Sony TV)
Adaalat–2 (Sony TV)
 Sarfarosh - Battle of Saragarhi (Netflix)
 "Swaraaj" (DD National)
 "Taj: Divided By Blood" (Zee 5)

Accolades
 Kalinga International Literary Award, 2017, Kalinga Literary Festival
 Anand Neelakantan was rated as one of the most promising writers by Indian Express, amongst the six most remarkable writers of 2012 by Daily News and Analysis and rated as the second most read writer of 2012 by Financial Express. 
 His first book Asura: Tale of the Vanquished was shortlisted for Crossword popular award in 2013 and his second book, Ajaya: Roll of the dice was shortlisted for Crossword popular award in 2014. His book The Rise of Sivagami (Baahubali #1) was short listed for Crossword popular award in 2018 
 His book The Rise of Sivagami (Baahubali #1) received accolades from top Indian book reviewers. Nala's Damayanti

See also
 List of Indian writers

References

External links

1973 births
Living people
Writers from Kochi
Government Engineering College, Thrissur alumni
Indian male novelists
Writers about Kali (demon)